Bradley Smyth (born March 13, 1973) is a Canadian former professional ice hockey player who endured a journeyman career and played in the National Hockey League with the Florida Panthers, Los Angeles Kings, New York Rangers, Nashville Predators and the Ottawa Senators.

Playing career
Smyth played 88 games in the National Hockey League, playing for the Florida Panthers, Los Angeles Kings, New York Rangers, Nashville Predators and the Ottawa Senators. In his 88 regular season games, Smyth scored 15 goals and 13 assists for 28 points.  He also collected 109 penalty minutes.  After leaving the NHL in 2003, Smyth had spells in Finland's SM-liiga with Kärpät and in the American Hockey League with the Manchester Monarchs and the Hartford Wolf Pack before joining German team Hamburg Freezers of the DEL in 2006.

On April 10, 2009, Smyth left the DEL as a free agent and signed with EBEL team, KHL Medveščak Zagreb, from Croatia. In the 2009–10 season, Smyth contributed with 18 goals to finish third for Zagreb. In the playoffs, he helped the team to an upset victory over Graz 99ers before falling to eventual champions EC Red Bull Salzburg to post 4 points in 11 games.

Unsigned with the KHL the following season, Smyth joined teammate Richard Seeley and signed in the British Elite Ice Hockey League, with the Belfast Giants on October 6, 2010.

After six years abroad in Europe, on August 14, 2012, Smyth returned to North America and was signed by head coach and former teammate Derek Armstrong to a one-year contract with the newly established Denver Cutthroats of the Central Hockey League. Despite his age, Smyth showed no loss in ability with the Cutthroats, in forming the league's top scoring line alongside A.J. Gale and Troy Schwab, with 23 goals and 78 points in 65 games. After the Cutthroats first round loss to eventual champions, the Allen Americans, Smyth announced the end of his 20-year playing career. He did this by accepting an assistant coach and assistant director of hockey operations role within the Cutthroats on June 4, 2013. After a successful season behind the bench with the Cutthroats, he was promoted to director of hockey operations and head coach.

Career statistics

Regular season and playoffs

Awards and honours

References

External links 

1973 births
Belfast Giants players
Binghamton Senators players
Birmingham Bulls (ECHL) players
Canadian ice hockey right wingers
Carolina Monarchs players
Cincinnati Cyclones (IHL) players
Denver Cutthroats players
Florida Panthers players
Hamburg Freezers players
Hartford Wolf Pack players
KHL Medveščak Zagreb players
Living people
London Knights players
Los Angeles Kings players
Manchester Monarchs (AHL) players
Milwaukee Admirals (IHL) players
Nashville Predators players
New York Rangers players
Ottawa Senators players
Oulun Kärpät players
Phoenix Roadrunners (IHL) players
Springfield Falcons players
Ice hockey people from Ottawa
Undrafted National Hockey League players
Ottawa Loggers players
Canadian expatriate ice hockey players in Northern Ireland
Canadian expatriate ice hockey players in Croatia
Canadian expatriate ice hockey players in Finland
Canadian expatriate ice hockey players in Germany
Canadian expatriate ice hockey players in France
Canadian expatriate ice hockey players in the United States
Canadian expatriate ice hockey players in Italy